Philip Howard, 13th Earl of Arundel (28 June 155719 October 1595) was an English nobleman. He was canonised by Pope Paul VI in 1970, as one of the Forty Martyrs of England and Wales. He is variously numbered as 1st, 20th or 13th Earl of Arundel. Philip Howard lived mainly during the reign of Queen Elizabeth I; he was charged with being a Roman Catholic, quitting England without leave, and sharing in Jesuit plots. For this, he was sent to the Tower of London in 1585. Howard spent ten years in the Tower, until his death from dysentery.

Early life

Philip was born in the Strand in London in 1557, during the upheaval of the English Reformation. He was the only son of Thomas Howard, 4th Duke of Norfolk by his first wife Mary FitzAlan, daughter of Henry FitzAlan, 12th Earl of Arundel and his first wife, Lady Katherine Grey. He was baptised at Whitehall Palace with the royal family in attendance, and was named after his godfather, King Philip II of Spain, husband of the ruling monarch, Mary I.

Philip's mother died while he was still an infant. His home from the age of seven was a former Carthusian monastery. Being the eldest son of the Duke of Norfolk and thus heir to the dukedom, Philip received from the moment of his birth the courtesy title of Earl of Surrey, a subsidiary title of the Dukes of Norfolk.

In 1569, it was arranged that Philip would marry his step-sister, Anne Dacre, daughter of his father's third wife by a previous marriage. Since both children were only 12 years old at the time, the ceremony was repeated two years later, after both parties had attained the age of consent. Philip's brothers Thomas and William likewise married Anne's sisters, Mary and Elizabeth respectively. 

Philip's father, a Catholic with a Protestant education, was arrested in 1569, because of involvement in intrigues against Queen Elizabeth. Although he was briefly released, he was imprisoned again in September 1571, after his participation in the Ridolfi Plot was discovered. He was executed in June 1572, when Philip was fifteen years old. After Norfolk's death, Philip and his surviving siblings Thomas, Margaret and William were left in the care of their uncle, Henry Howard, who also took charge of their education. During this time, the Howard children lived with their uncle at Audley End, one of his family's estates. Due to his father's execution, Philip lost the title of Earl of Surrey and many of his paternal family's properties, which were forfeit, although a part of what he had lost was later returned to him.  

Philip graduated from St John's College, Cambridge in 1574, aged 17. He began attending Elizabeth I's court by the time he turned eighteen; notably, this was only a few years after his father's execution for treason against the queen. His life had been frivolous both at Cambridge and remained so at court, where he nevertheless became a favourite of the queen.

In July 1578, his maternal aunt, Jane FitzAlan died without living descendants, as all the three children born of her marriage to John Lumley, 1st Baron Lumley had died in infancy. After the death of his aunt, Philip, being the only surviving descendant of his maternal grandfather, Henry FitzAlan, 12th Earl of Arundel, became the heir to the Earldom of Arundel  and the vast properties Henry owned in Sussex, including Arundel Castle, the main home of the FitzAlan family, which became the main residence of Philip's descendants. After his grandfather's death in February 1580, Howard received the entire inheritance of his maternal family, as well as becoming the new Earl of Arundel. Since then, the title of Arundel has remained in the hands of the Howard family, and with the restoration of the dukedom of Norfolk in 1660, remained as a subsidiary title of the dukes.

Conversion and imprisonment
Howard was present at a debate which took place in 1581 in the Tower of London between Catholic priests Edmund Campion and Ralph Sherwin and a group of Protestant theologians.

Philip was originally baptised as a Catholic and although he received a Protestant education, a vein of Catholicism was never far below the earl's surface, mostly due to the fact that his close relations had remained loyal to the Roman Church during the Reformation. His maternal grandfather was a staunch Catholic, his father, who had also been educated as a Protestant but was a Catholic, was disgraced for having conspired against Elizabeth with the intention of replacing her with Mary, Queen of Scots and thus restore Catholicism in England. His paternal grandfather, the Earl of Surrey, also fell out of favour and was executed by Henry VIII, partly because he was a Catholic.

In 1583, the earl was suspected of complicity in the Throckmorton Plot. He prepared to escape to the Spanish Netherlands, but his plans were interrupted by a visit from Elizabeth at his house in London and her order that he confine himself there. 

That same year, the Countess of Arundel, without her husband's knowledge and in great fear of his displeasure, secretly returned to the illegal and underground Catholic Church in England. After much effort, she successfully regained her husband's affection.

On 30 September 1584, the earl was also secretly received into the Catholic Church by underground Jesuit priest Father William Weston. The earl, while still attending Elizabeth's court, successfully hid his conversion for a time, before withdrawing to his home and attempting to focus on being a better husband and father. The next year, Howard acted against Father Weston's cautions, by attempting to flee to mainland Europe in order to live openly as a Catholic with his wife and children.  

His flight abroad was recommended, planned, and betrayed to Sir Francis Walsingham by a trusted servant, whom Father Philip Caraman identifies as the earl's chaplain, underground Roman Catholic priest and agent provocateur Father Edward Grately. While many other recusants had been able to successfully flee England unobserved, the Earl of Arundel, through his kinship to the late Anne Boleyn, was a second cousin once removed of the queen. He himself was widely considered by persecuted Roman Catholics as a possible successor to the English throne. The earl's ship was accordingly boarded while setting sail from Littlehampton, where he was arrested and committed to the Tower of London on 25 April 1585  

He was charged before the Star Chamber with being a Roman Catholic, with quitting England without leave, sharing in Jesuit plots, and claiming the dukedom of Norfolk in defiance of his father's attainder. On 17 May 1586, he was fined £10,000 and sentenced to imprisonment at the queen's pleasure. In July 1586 his liberty was offered to him if he would carry the sword of state before the queen to church. In 1588 he was accused of praying, together with other Catholics, for the victory of the Spanish Armada. He was tried for high treason on 14 April 1589 and was found guilty. He was immediately condemned to death and attainted, with all his titles and property declared forfeit to the Crown.

In a letter dated 1 May 1589 to Claudio Aquaviva, Father Henry Garnet recalled, "When the sentence was pronounced and the crowd saw the Earl coming out of the hall with the axe-edge turned in towards him -- in the trial of nobles this is the sign that the prisoner has been condemned -- suddenly there was a great uproar that was carried miles along the river bank, some people demanding what had come of the Queen's clemency that such a splendid and gallant gentleman should suffer condemnation, others passionately indignant that a man who had prayed to God should be executed for that alone. For among the accusations brought against him, the principle charge and the one on which the whole case turned, was this -- he had asked a certain priest to pray for the success of the Spanish fleet; whereas in fact, all his enemies could prove against him and all he had done was this, that he sought that prayers should be said every day and night in the Tower of London and in other prisons at that time, chiefly, when everyone was expecting a general massacre [of Catholics]."

Queen Elizabeth did not sign his death warrant, but Howard was never told this. He was kept constantly in fear of execution, although comforted by the companionship of a dog, which served as a go-between by which Howard and other prisoners, most notably the priest Robert Southwell, could smuggle messages to each other. Although these two men never met, Howard's dog helped them to deepen their friendship and exchange encouragement in each other's plight. Philip Howard loved his pet, who is remembered along with him in a statue at Arundel Cathedral.

One day Howard scratched into a wall of his cell the words:  ("the more affliction [we endure] for Christ in this world, the more glory [we shall obtain] with Christ in the next") (cf. Romans, chapter 8).

Howard spent more than ten years in the Tower. Father Weston later recalled, "While he was enduring these cruel sufferings an offer of liberation was made him in the Queen's name, but on condition that he held a disputation with the so-called Archbishop of Canterbury. This he refused to do. He preferred to be afflicted in the company of God's people than to possess the passing pleasures of temporal freedom. Indeed, he reckoned persecution a greater happiness than the frail and shallow satisfaction of worldly well-being."

Death and burial
During the autumn of 1595, while dying of dysentery, the earl petitioned the queen to be allowed to see his wife and his son, who had been born after his imprisonment. The queen responded, "If he will but once attend the Protestant Service, he shall not only see his wife and children, but be restored to his honours and estates with every mark of my royal favour". To this, Howard is said to have replied: "Tell Her Majesty if my religion be the cause for which I suffer, sorry I am that I have but one life to lose". He remained in the Tower, never seeing his wife or son again, and died alone on Sunday 19 October 1595. 

Father Weston later recalled, "There were some who thought he was carried off by poison. I, however, made careful inquiries of a certain Catholic who had served him as a page at that time in the Tower, but I was never able to get any confirmation of this. As he lay dying he bequeathed to me the breviary which he used: but Father Garnet decided to keep it himself for posterity like some religious object. He did not dare to entrust it to me, for everything I had was likely to be seized at any moment, and he did not think it right to expose to such manifold risk a possession which, he declared, was more precious than gold."

According to Father Philip Caraman, Garnet also kept the breviary which Robert Southwell had used in the Tower of London. Both, however, were lost in a raid by priest hunters on Garnet's London safe house.

Howard was buried beneath the floor of the church of St Peter ad Vincula, inside the walls of the Tower. The earl's funeral and burial, according to Father Caraman, "cost his frugal Sovereign two pounds."

The Countess of Arundel took a vow of chastity after being widowed, and never remarried. She spent her remaining days writing Christian poetry, attending mass, and making other religious observances. She had a passion for helping those in need and especially people who were sick.

In 1624, the dowager countess and their son obtained permission from  King James I to move Howard's remains, first to the residence of the dowager countess at West Horsley, Surrey, and finally to the Fitzalan Chapel at Arundel Castle in Sussex.

The dowager countess died of natural causes on 19 April 1630 at Shifnal Manor, Shropshire aged 73, and was buried next to her husband inside the Fitzalan Chapel.

Even though Howard had been attainted at his trial in 1589, his son Thomas Howard was restored to his inheritance by King James I. He accordingly succeeded to the earldom of Arundel as well as to the lesser titles of his grandfather.

Legacy

Along with Our Lady of the Assumption, St. Philip Howard is co-patron of the Roman Catholic Diocese of Arundel and Brighton. Arundel Cathedral, originally dedicated to St. Philip Neri, was commissioned by the 15th Duke of Norfolk in 1868. It was elevated to the status of a cathedral in 1965 and its dedication changed to Our Lady and Saint Philip Howard just after Pope Paul VI canonised the earl as one of the Forty Martyrs of England and Wales in October 1970. In 1971, Howard's remains were moved from the Fitzalan Chapel to the cathedral, where the new shrine had been erected. Since then, the shrine has become a place of pilgrimage.

While imprisoned, Howard spent much of his time writing and translating Catholic poetry and devotional literature. The manuscripts, according to Father Caraman, were routinely smuggled out of the Tower of London to be edited and corrected by Father William Weston, before in at least one case, being smuggled to the Spanish Netherlands for publication by exiled English Recusant Richard Verstegan.

For example, the earl made a Latin-Elizabethan English translation of An Epistle in the Person of Jesus Christ to the Faithful Soule by John Justus of Landsberg, which was posthumously published at Antwerp (1595, reprinted 1871). Howard's verse translation of Marko Marulić's poem Carmen de doctrina Domini nostri Iesu Christi pendentis in cruce ("A Dialogue Betwixt a Christian and Christ Hanging on the Crosse"), served in lieu of an introduction in the Antwerp edition. Howard's poetry translation of Marulić was published again, with updated English orthography, in the March/April 2022 issue of the Traditionalist Catholic literary magazine, St. Austin Review. 

Howard also authored three manuscript treatises On the Excellence and Utility of Virtue.

Further detailed research about the earl's life, as well as several of his works of Christian poetry, was collected by Irish American poet Louise Imogen Guiney and published as part of her 1939 collection The Recusant Poets.

See also

 Howard's great-grandson, also named Philip Howard, a Catholic cardinal.

References

Sources
 
 
 Sigrid Undset, Stages on the Road (copyright 1934)
 Profile, HistoryOrb.com. Accessed 1 December 2022.
 

1557 births
1595 deaths
16th-century Christian saints
16th-century Roman Catholic martyrs
16th-century English nobility
Alumni of St John's College, Cambridge
17
10
Burials at the Church of St Peter ad Vincula
Canonizations by Pope Paul VI
Converts to Roman Catholicism from Anglicanism
Deaths from dysentery
20
English Catholic poets
English Roman Catholic saints
Howard
Philip Howard, 13th Earl of Arundel
Howard, Philip
Prisoners in the Tower of London
People from the City of Westminster
Recusants